The parallel mixed team competition of the 2016 Winter Youth Olympics was held at the Hafjell Olympic Slope on 20 February.

Participants

Bracket

References

External list
Bracket

Parallel mixed team